The Rovasenda is a 38 km long stream of Piedmont, in north-western Italy. It's a left side tributary of the Cervo which flows through the provinces of Biella and Vercelli.

Geography 
The Rovasenda is formed in the eastern and hilly part of the Alpi Biellesi from the confluence of three streams; Riale Ravasanella, Rio Valnava and Rio della Valle. The stream is initially named Torrente Giara and gets the name of Torrente Rovasenda near a town of the same name, Rovasenda. Heading south it crosses the Baraggia heathland and then the paddy fields of the province of Vercelli. Near Villarboit the Rovasenda is overpassed by Canale Cavour (one of the main irrigation canals in Italy) through a water bridge.
In its lowest course the stream receives the waters of several small canals and part of its water is diverted for irrigation purposes. Not far from Collobiano the Rovasenda end its course flowing into the river Cervo at 141.1 matres s.l.m.

See also 
 Alpi Biellesi

References

Other projects

Rivers of the Province of Biella
Rivers of the Province of Vercelli
Rivers of the Alps
Rivers of Italy